Stigmella fuscacalyptriella is a moth of the family Nepticulidae. It was described by Puplesis in 1994. It is known from Azerbayjan.

References

Nepticulidae
Moths of Asia
Moths described in 1994